Club Deportivo Bosco–Real Club Celta de Vigo Baloncesto is a Spanish women's basketball club from Vigo related to football club Celta de Vigo, that currently plays in the Second League.

History

The club was founded in 1965 as Club Estudiantes de Vigo and became a section of the local football club Celta in 1969. Celta Vigo won three national leagues and three national cups between 1977 and 1984 including a double in 1982.

The section was disbanded in 1988, but in 1996 it was refounded in association with CD Bosco. The new team's first seasons were very successful, winning two more leagues and a fourth cup between 1999 and 2001.

In following years, Celta became a mid-lower table team until 2012, when it resigned to play in the top tier due to financial strain, and joined the Liga Femenina 2.

In 2018, the club qualified for the promotion playoffs for the first time since their voluntary relegation, as champions of the Liga Femenina 2 Group A, but could not promote after failing in the last match.

Season by season

Titles
 Liga Femenina (5)
 1977, 1979, 1982, 1999, 2000
 Copa de la Reina (4)
 1981, 1982, 1984, 2001

References

External links
Official website 
Profile at Spanish Basketball Federation

Basketball teams established in 1965
Women's basketball teams in Spain
Sport in Vigo
basketball
1965 establishments in Spain
Basketball teams in Galicia (Spain)